Rahkeim Calief Meyer (born February 11, 1978), better known by his stage name Roc Marciano, is an American rapper, songwriter, and producer.

Career
Roc Marciano started his career in 2000 when he joined Busta Rhymes collective the Flipmode Squad & made his first appearance on "The Heist". Marciano left in 2001 to form the U.N., a hardcore underground hip hop group consisting of three other MCs (Dino Brave, Laku & Mic Raw) with whom he released an album on Carson Daly's 456 Entertainment in 2004. Roc Marciano appeared in the 2005 Wu-Tang Clan compilation album, Wu-Tang Meets the Indie Culture, and in Pete Rock's 2008 album, NY's Finest, drawing acclaim for such performances. Since 2008, Roc Marciano has been working on his solo career, and to widespread internet acclaim, released his entirely self-produced debut album, Marcberg in 2010.

In 2011, Roc Marciano collaborated with Gangrene to release the collaborative EP Greneberg. His second solo album, Reloaded, was released in November 2012, which Allmusic described as "Grim and exultant at once, this is low-profile hustling on wax at its finest." He also collaborated with Kendrick Lamar and Consequence on Up Against the Wall which is featured in Consequence's mixtape, "Movies On Demand 2".

In late 2013, Marciano released a free mixtape, The Pimpire Strikes Back. The mixtape served as preface to his third studio album, Marci Beaucoup, that was entirely produced by him and had featured artists such as Action Bronson, Evidence, Ka, Maffew Ragazino, Quelle Chris and many more in each and every song.

On February 21, 2017, Roc Marciano released Rosebudd's Revenge via his website RocMarci.com. The album features Ka and Knowledge the Pirate, frequent Roc Marciano collaborators, and production from the Arch Druids, Mushroom Jesus, Modus Op, Knxwledge, and Roc Marciano himself.

On February 27, 2018, Marciano released his fifth studio album Rosebudd's Revenge 2: The Bitter Dose, via his website RocMarci.com. The album features guest appearances from Knowledge the Pirate and Action Bronson and production from E.L.E.M.N.T., Animoss, Don Cee, and Marciano himself.

Freemusicempire named Roc Marciano as 2018 MVP. Dan-O commented "Our newly crowned FME MVP of 2018 released three albums this year. Each handled with a curators eye; three albums with a total of 36 songs which averages to 12 songs per album. Each one shading his story a different hue, taking a step further in creating a full landscape while maintaining a two fisted approach to punch lines that would have made prized pugilist Rocky Marciano proud."

Discography

 2010: Marcberg
 2012: Reloaded
 2013: Marci Beaucoup
 2017: Rosebudd's Revenge
 2018: RR2: The Bitter Dose
 2018: Behold a Dark Horse
 2018: Kaos (with DJ Muggs)
 2019: Marcielago
 2020: Mt. Marci
 2022: The Elephant Man’s Bones (with The Alchemist)

References

External links
Marcberg review
Marcberg review and Marciano biography
Roc Marciano talks about the U.N.
The Prophecy EP Re-Issue by Goodfelons

1978 births
Living people
African-American male rappers
Rappers from New York (state)
People from Hempstead (village), New York
East Coast hip hop musicians
African-American record producers
American hip hop record producers
21st-century American rappers
Record producers from New York (state)
21st-century American male musicians
Underground rappers
Indie rappers
21st-century African-American musicians
20th-century African-American people